John Witherspoon Scott (January 22, 1800 – November 29, 1892) was an American Presbyterian minister, academic, and college administrator. His daughter Caroline Harrison became First Lady of the United States after her husband, Benjamin Harrison, was elected as president.

Early life and education
The son of George McElroy Scott (1759–1848) and Anna Rey (1775–1852), John was born in Beaver County, Pennsylvania. He received his college education at Yale University and was ordained as a Presbyterian minister.

Marriage and family

Scott married Mary Potts Neal (12 October 1811 – 1876). They had five children:

 Elizabeth Mayhew Scott (1828–1889); married in 1849 Russell Farnham Lord (1802–1867), and had issue, including Mary Dimmick Harrison.
 Caroline Lavinia "Carrie" Scott (1832–1892); married future United States President Benjamin Harrison in 1853, and had issue.
 John Neal Scott (1836–1898); married Eleanor Gorgas and had issue.
 Henry M. Scott (1838–1877)
 Mary E. Scott (1843–1872); married James W. Spear and had issue.

Career
Scott was hired in the 1820s at Miami University in Oxford, Ohio, as its first professor of science. He was fired for his anti-slavery views during the presidency of George Junkin. 

After teaching for several years in Cincinnati, Scott returned to Oxford in 1849, having been appointed as the first president of the Presbyterian Oxford Female Institute. His daughter Caroline graduated from there in 1852.

As minister, Scott presided over the wedding of his daughter to Benjamin Harrison in 1853. Dr. Scott served as president of the Oxford Female College and as a professor at Hanover College.

Later years
After his wife's death, Scott lived with President and Mrs. Harrison in the White House during their term. Both he and his daughter died there in 1892, he a month after her.

References

1800 births
1892 deaths
People from Beaver County, Pennsylvania
Miami University faculty
19th-century Presbyterian ministers
Hanover College faculty
Yale University alumni
Academics from Pennsylvania
Academics from Ohio
Benjamin Harrison